Charles Lamancha is a fictional character who appears in several novels by John Buchan.

He was a war veteran, a noble and a Minister of the Crown. He is a good friend of John Palliser-Yeates and Edward Leithen.

Appearances
John Macnab (1925)
The Gap in the Curtain	
The House of the Four Winds	
A Prince of the Captivity	
The Runagates Club
The Island of Sheep (1936) (brief mention only)

John Buchan characters